Reprieve may refer to:
 In criminal proceedings, the act of postponing the enforcement of a sentence, particularly a death sentence, to allow an appeal; see Pardon#Related concepts
 Reprieve (organisation), a group of organisations working against the death penalty
 Reprieve (album), a 2006 album by Ani DiFranco
 The Reprieve, a 1947 novel by Jean-Paul Sartre
 The Reprieve (1913 film), an Australian melodrama
 The Reprieve (1961 film), a Spanish drama
 Convicts 4, also known as Reprieve, a 1962 American prison film